WPEH-FM (92.1 FM) is a radio station broadcasting an Oldies format. It is licensed to Louisville, Georgia, United States.  The station is currently owned by Peach Broadcasting Co., Inc. and features programming from CNN Radio and Westwood One.

References

External links

PEH-FM
Radio stations established in 1977